Agios Eleftherios may refer to a neighbourhood, two villages and one church in Greece:

Agios Eleftherios, Athens, a neighbourhood of Athens
Agios Eleftherios, Kefalonia, a village on Kefalonia
Agios Eleftherios, Larissa, a village in the Larissa regional unit
Agios Eleftherios Church, Athens (Mikri Mitrópoli), a Byzantine church in Athens